Lee Currin Gooch (February 23, 1890 – May 18, 1966) was a Major League Baseball outfielder who played for two seasons. He played for the Cleveland Indians in 1915 and the Philadelphia Athletics in 1917.  Gooch also served as the head baseball coach at Duke University in 1919 and at Wake Forest University from 1949 to 1950.

References

External links

1890 births
1966 deaths
Major League Baseball outfielders
Cleveland Indians players
Philadelphia Athletics players
Duke Blue Devils baseball coaches
Wake Forest Demon Deacons baseball coaches
Baseball players from North Carolina
Durham Bulls managers
Portland Beavers players
Jacksonville Tarpons players
Richmond Colts players
Moline Plowboys players
Durham Bulls players
Rocky Mount Broncos players
Rocky Mount Buccaneers players
Henderson Bunnies players